Highs in the Mid-Sixties, Volume 21 (subtitled Ohio, Part 2) is a compilation album in the Highs in the Mid-Sixties series, featuring recordings that were released in Ohio. Highs in the Mid-Sixties, Volume 9 is an earlier volume in the series that features bands from this state.

Release data
This album was released in 1985 as an LP by AIP Records (as #AIP-10030).

Notes on the tracks
The "S. Owsley" reference as the songwriter for the song by The Wild Thing—slang for sexual intercourse, by the way—is an apparent reference to Owsley Stanley; while the song title is a reference to LSD.

Track listing

Side 1
 Richard Pash & the Backdoor Society: "I'm the Kind" (Dull/Pash)
 The Unknown Kind: "Who Cares" (Marren/Blechler)
 It's Them: "Baby I Still Want Your Lovin'" (Steve Welkom) -- rel. 1966
 The Epics: "White Collar Home" (Richards/Knox/Miller)
 The Endless: "Prevailing Darkness" (J. McAtee/R. McAtee)
 The Endless: "Tomorrow's Song" (J. McAtee/R. McAtee)
 The Beau Denturies: "Straight Home" (Burnman/Harriman)

Side 2
 The Pictorian Skiffuls: "In Awhile" (Smith/McIntosh) – rel. 1965
 Baron Thomas & the Blue Crystals: "Tension" (Baron Thomas)
 The Panicks: "Treat Me Right" (Don Feldman)
 The Hazards: "Tinted Green" (Jason C. Lee)
 The Wild Thing: "A.C.I.D." (S. Owsley)
 The Four O'Clock Balloon: "Dark Cobble Street" (Sheppard) – rel. 1967
 The Young Generation: "Paperback Minds" (McCain/Simoson/Brink)

Pebbles (series) albums
1985 compilation albums